, better known by his stage name , is a Japanese actor, voice actor and director.

Izawa was born in Tokyo, Japan and is the director of the theatrical troupe Big Face, and a member of Theater Echo. He appeared with fellow Theater Echo member Chihoko Shigeta in the popular "Itadakimasu Gekijō" segment of Raion no Itadakimasu on Fuji TV. Izawa has chaired organizations including the World Music Festival of Peace, the Yomiuri Giants Fan Appreciation Day, and the Tokyo International Marathon.

History
In 1979, Izawa joined Theater Echo, performing in many stage productions through 1988. In 1985, he began performing in works produced by Yasutaka Tsutsui, becoming Tsutsui's top choice for any role. Beginning in 1995, Izawa helped organize "Tsutsui World," even taking it to Los Angeles in 1996. From 2001 to 2002, Izawa performed in the Theater X production of Dario Fō no Bikkuri Hako. He then went on to direct the new Warau Onna. Warawareru Otoko series, writing the scripts as well.

Commercial work
Izawa has starred in commercials for Casio, Dariko, Idemitsu, Kobayashi Pharmaceuticals, Suntory, Aione and Ajinomoto. He has also narrated various materials for Kodansha, Marubeni, Toyota, Taisei Rotec, Tokyo Gas, Otsuka Corporation, Manulife, Lion Corporation, NTT Docomo, and Calpis.

Anime

TV
High School! Kimengumi (2001-2005) - Kō Irooto, Ken Akiresu

Movies
11 Piki no Neko (1980 version)
Urusei Yatsura Movie 1: Only You (1983) - Announcer
BOM!
Choudenshi Bioman (1984) - Metzler
Tsushimamaru: Sayonara Okinawa
The Wings of Honneamise (1987) - Darigan

Tokusatsu
Choudenshi Bioman (1984) - Mettzler (ep. 1 - 49)
Kyodai_Ken_Byclosser (1985) - Togebara (ep. 11)
Chouseishin Gransazer (2004) - Alien Stone Lamon/Koujirou Kanuma (ep. 30)

Live action movies
Sasurai no Trouble Buster

Radio
Heisei Yawa
Izawa Hiroshi no Uta Demae

Theatre
Dario Fō no Bikkuri Hako
Warau Onna. Warawareru Otoko series (script, director)

TV drama
Aoi Hanabi
Futari de Dango o
Gokusen
Hamidashi Keiji
Ii Hito.
Kyōshi Binbin Monogatari?
Magician Keiji
Shiawase Zukuri
Shin Omizu no Hanamichi
Tengoku no Daisuke e

TV variety shows
Itadakimasu

Video
Box 39
Shizuka Naru Don 7

External links
Big Face 

 

1955 births
Japanese male voice actors
Living people
People from Tokyo
Japanese theatre directors